Acleris duracina is a species of moth of the family Tortricidae. It is found in China (Shensi).

References

Moths described in 1974
duracina
Moths of Asia